Dorogobuzhsky (masculine), Dorogobuzhskaya (feminine), or Dorogobuzhskoye (neuter) may refer to:
Dorogobuzhsky District, a district of Smolensk Oblast, Russia
Dorogobuzhskoye Urban Settlement, an administrative division and a municipal formation which the town of Dorogobuzh in Dorogobuzhsky District of Smolensk Oblast, Russia is incorporated as
Dorogobuzhsky (cheese), a soft cheese from Western Russia
Dorogobuzhsky (family), a princely family of Rurikid stock